Capellades is a town in Catalonia, Spain, located in the south of the comarca of Anoia, some sixty metres above the Anoia river where it cuts through the Catalan Coastal Range. The C-15 trunk road from Vilafranca del Penedès and the FGC railway line R6 from Martorell and Barcelona run along the river valley below the town on their way to Igualada. It is about one hour from Barcelona by car, bus or train.

Capellades is known for the manufacture of paper since the seventeenth century. A paper manufacturer in Capellades (established in 1714) specialised today in producing security paper is the oldest company in Spain. In the town there is also a Museum of Paper (Molí-Museu Paperer) housed in a converted papermill.

There is a small amount of agriculture, both irrigated (market gardening) and non-irrigated (cereals, grapes, almonds), although the territory of the municipality is small. Textile and ceramic manufacture and tourism during the summer also contribute to the local economy. Munich (sport shoes) has its headquarters in Capellades.

The site has been inhabited since the middle Paleolithic era (50000 years BP), and an archeological site just below the modern town, known locally as the Abric Romaní, is open to the public.

Demography

References

Panareda Clopés, Josep Maria; Rios Calvet, Jaume; Rabella Vives, Josep Maria (1989). "Guia de Catalunya", Barcelona: Caixa de Catalunya.  (Spanish).  (Catalan).

External links 

  
 Government data pages 
  

Municipalities in Anoia
Populated places in Anoia